Lake Pape is a lake in Latvia about  south of Liepaja. It is surrounded by the Pape Nature Reserve.

Lakes of Latvia